The 1919 Mount Union Purple football team was an American football team that represented Mount Union College (now known as University of Mount Union) during the 1919 college football season as a member of the Ohio Athletic Conference (OAC). Led by George O'Brien in his third and final year as head coach, Mount Union compiled a record of 1–7 overall with a mark of 0–5 in OAC play.

Schedule

References

Mount Union
Mount Union Purple Raiders football seasons
Mount Union Purple football